The 1945 NSWRFL season was the thirty-eighth New South Wales Rugby Football League premiership season, Sydney’s top-level rugby league club competition, and Australia’s first. Eight teams from across the city contested during the season which culminated in Eastern Suburbs' victory over Balmain in the grand final.

Teams
 Balmain, formed on January 23, 1908, at Balmain Town Hall
 Canterbury-Bankstown
 Eastern Suburbs, formed on January 24, 1908, at Paddington Town Hall
 Newtown, formed on January 14, 1908
 North Sydney, formed on February 7, 1908
 South Sydney, formed on January 17, 1908, at Redfern Town Hall
 St. George, formed on November 8, 1920, at Kogarah School of Arts
 Western Suburbs, formed on February 4, 1908

Ladder

Finals

Premiership final

Balmain led 10–5 at half time and the match was evenly balanced throughout the second half. With three minutes to go the Tricolours trailed 17—18. The Roosters were awarded a penalty on half way and Dick Dunn convinced his reluctant captain Ray Stehr that he could make the distance. Dunn successfully kicked the goal from the then unorthodox upright position.

Dunn received Joe Jorgenson’s kick from the restart and booted the ball into touch five metres from the Balmain line. Tricolours’  George Watt won the scrum against the feed and Easts’ classy halves pairing of Sel Lisle and Wally O'Connell put on a move that saw Dunn score in the corner.

Dunn scored 19 of the Tricolours’ 22 points that day carrying with him for luck the sock of his fourteen-month-old daughter in his shorts pocket throughout the match.

Eastern Suburbs 22 (Tries: Dunn 3, J Arnold. Goals: Dunn 5)

defeated

Balmain  18 (Tries: Ponchard 2, Dawes, Nielsen. Goals: Jorgenson 3)

Player statistics
The following statistics are as of the conclusion of Round 14.

Top 5 point scorers

Top 5 try scorers

Top 5 goal scorers

References

External links

 Rugby League Tables - Notes AFL Tables
 Rugby League Tables - Season 1945 AFL Tables
 
 Finals lineups and results Hunterlink site
 Sean Fagan interviews Dick Dunn. 
 Sydney Morning Herald 30sept2004 SMH interviews Dick Dunn
 Results: 1941-1950 at rabbitohs.com.au
 1945 Labor Daily Cup at rleague.com
 NSWRFL season 1945 at rugbyleagueproject.org

New South Wales Rugby League premiership
Nswrfl season